Fort Custer National Cemetery is a United States National Cemetery located just outside the village of Augusta in Kalamazoo County, Michigan. It encompasses , and  had 33,000 interments.

History 
Named for General George Armstrong Custer, the original Camp Custer was built in 1917 as part of the military mobilization during World War I. After the war, it also served as a demobilization camp. The cemetery itself was not created until 1943. During World War II Fort Custer was expanded to serve as a training ground and as a place to hold German prisoners of war.

Of the German POWs held during World War II, 26 died and were buried in the cemetery. Sixteen of them were killed when a truck carrying them from a work detail collided with a train near Blissfield, Michigan.

It was not until 1981 that Fort Custer cemetery officially became Fort Custer National Cemetery, receiving a large plot of land from the Fort Custer Training Center for expansion.

Noteworthy monuments 
 The Avenue of Flags, a row of 152 flag poles along the main road of the cemetery, as well as the main flagpole and an additional 50 flag poles, one for each state flag, in a semicircle at the road end.

 Fort Custer features a memorial pathway lined with a variety of memorials that honor America's veterans, donated by various organizations. As of 2007, there were 31 memorials at Fort Custer National Cemetery-most commemorating military organizations and veterans' groups.

Notable burials
 Wade Herbert Flemons (1940–1993) of Battle Creek, Michigan, served in the U.S. Army during the Vietnam War from September 1965 to September 1967. He was an American soul singer and founding member of the musical group Earth, Wind & Fire. His solo music career began in 1958, at age seventeen, when he released a regional hit "Here I Stand" while still in high school. By the late 1960s he was working as a session musician and songwriter in Chicago. He partnered with Maurice White and formed The Salty Peppers in 1969, which became Earth, Wind & Fire. Flemons was a vocalist in the group for their first two albums and left the band in 1972. He wrote more than 200 songs in his career and performed with acts such as Bo Didley, Jackie Wilson, Curtis Mayfield, and Frankie Valli. 

 Sergeant Donald E. Boven (1925–2011) enlisted in the Army after graduating high school in 1943 and served with the U.S. Third Army in Europe During WWII. He landed on Omaha Beach D-Day plus 2 and participated in the Battle of the Bulge. Boven was born in Kalamazoo, Michigan, and stood out as an athlete. After WWII he attended Western Michigan using his G.I. Bill benefit. He was a star athlete there in football, basketball, and baseball. After graduation he had offers to play all of his sports professionally, but chose basketball. He was drafted by the Indianapolis Olympians in 1949. Throughout his career he played for the Waterloo Hawks, Milwaukee Hawks, Baltimore Bullets, and Fort Wayne Pistons. He retired from professional basketball in 1953 and began a long career as coach and instructor at his alma mater. He retired after 32 years there in 1985 and lived an active retirement.

 Private First Class Benjamin Franklin Adams (1936–2005) was born in Norfolk, VA. He was a talented right-handed pitcher in the American Negro League from 1952 to 1969. Adams' professional baseball career began with the Indianapolis Clowns in 1952. The following year he was the starting pitcher for the Memphis Red Sox. He joined the Kansas City Monarchs in 1955 and spent the remainder of his baseball career with that club. From 1956 to 1957 his professional baseball career was put on hold due to his enlistment in the Army, though he played baseball in the service. He was a member of American Legion Post 0059 and the Teamsters Union.

See also
 Fort Custer Recreation Area – a state facility converted from the original Fort Custer military reservation

External links 
 National Cemetery Administration
 Fort Custer National Cemetery
 
 

Cemeteries in Michigan
Protected areas of Kalamazoo County, Michigan
United States national cemeteries
1943 establishments in Michigan